is a former Japanese football player and manager. He manager of Vanraure Hachinohe.

Club career
Ishizaki was born in Hiroshima on March 14, 1958. After graduating from Tokyo University of Agriculture, he joined Toshiba in 1980. He played until 1993.

Managerial career
After retirement, Ishizaki started coaching career at NEC Yamagata (later Montedio Yamagata) in 1995. After that, he managed many J.League club, Oita Trinita (1999-2001), Kawasaki Frontale (2001-2003), Shimizu S-Pulse (2004), Tokyo Verdy (2005), Kashiwa Reysol (2006-2008), Consadole Sapporo (2009-2012) and Montedio Yamagata (2014-2016). In 2017, he signed with Regional Leagues club Tegevajaro Miyazaki. He resigned in June 2018. In July 2018, he signed with J3 League club Fujieda MYFC.

In 2021, Ishizaki joined as manager of J3 club, Kataller Toyama but, he left from club in 2022 after resignation. In 27 November 2022, Ishizaki joined as manager of J3 club, Vanraure Hachinohe from 2023 season who replace Ryo Shigaki after contract expiration.

Career statistics

Club

.

Managerial statistics

.

References

External links

1958 births
Living people
Tokyo University of Agriculture alumni
Association football people from Hiroshima Prefecture
Japanese footballers
Japan Soccer League players
Japan Football League (1992–1998) players
Hokkaido Consadole Sapporo players
Japanese football managers
J1 League managers
J2 League managers
J3 League managers
Montedio Yamagata managers
Oita Trinita managers
Kawasaki Frontale managers
Shimizu S-Pulse managers
Tokyo Verdy managers
Kashiwa Reysol managers
Hokkaido Consadole Sapporo managers
Tegevajaro Miyazaki managers
Fujieda MYFC managers
Kataller Toyama managers
Vanraure Hachinohe managers
Association football defenders